Kevin David Masters (born 19 May 1961) is an English former professional cricketer. Masters was born at Chatham in Kent and played for Kent County Cricket Club between 1983 and 1984.

Masters made his first-class cricket debut for Kent against Hampshire in 1983. He played four first-class matches for Kent, the last of which came against Somerset, and one limited overs match against Worcestershire in 1984.

After a gap of 11 years Masters made his Minor Counties Championship debut for Cambridgeshire County Cricket Club against Norfolk. He later represented the Kent Cricket Board in List A cricket.

He has played club cricket for Upchurch Cricket Club in the Kent Cricket League and runs a building and construction company, KD Masters.

Family
Masters' son, David, played over 200 first-class cricket matches for Kent, Leicestershire and Essex. Another son, Daniel played briefly for Leicestershire between 2009 and 2010.

References

External links

1961 births
Living people
Sportspeople from Chatham, Kent
English cricketers
Kent cricketers
Cambridgeshire cricketers
Kent Cricket Board cricketers